Marlo is a small village in the Gippsland region of Victoria, Australia. Marlo has received great recognition for having wonderful beaches, unfortunately as a small village, it lacks sufficient shopping outlets which makes it a hassle for tourists and locals to shop for their needs. It is located east near the mouth of the Snowy River where the Snowy River meets and flows into the Southern Ocean. 
The name "Marlo" is generally accepted to have roots in tribal aboriginal language.  "Marloo" meaning white clay is suggestive of the Marlo Bluff, whilst "Murloo" meaning "muddy banks" was reportedly used by the local indigenous people.
At the 2006 census, Marlo had a population of 564.

The first settler to occupy the Marlo township area was James Stirling around the year 1875.  He built a bark hut on the bluff that had two rooms, bark walls, earthen floors and a shingle roof.  By 1884, this structure had expanded to a 9 roomed accommodation house and in 1886 became the Marlo Hotel when a liquor license was granted.

The Governor-in-Council declared Marlo to be a township on 18 February 1889. 
During May 1889, the government surveyor, E.L. Bruce set out 19 sections of the new township, with the first sales of subdivided land occurring the following May.

At this time, Stirling's Marlo Hotel was the unofficial hub for the community.  It was a general store, accommodation house and the unofficial post office, with settlers taking turns in bringing the mail from Orbost or Cunningham.  This continued until Aug 1942, and in 1969 was located in a house adjacent to the Marlo Hotel, before being transferred to the Marlo General Store in this year.  The official Post Office List states the Marlo Post Office opened around 1902.

Notable years in Marlo's History:  
1845-1874 Norman McLeod holds the land around Marlo
1854 Charles Petersen employs 40 men to strip wattle bark along the Snowy River for tanneries in Europe
1875 James Stirling occupies land at the Marlo Bluff
1880 Snowy River Shipping Company formed
1880 Marlo's population is 30 residents
1884 James Stirling's Marlo Accommodation House
1886 James Stirling's Marlo Hotel
1889 The "Neptune" wrecked at Pearl Point with Martin Jorgenson
1889 Marlo declared a township
1890 First Marlo land sales adjacent to Jorgenson St
1891 Samuel Richardson builds the Curlip paddle steamer
1893 First telephone installed at Marlo Hotel
1894 Duncan Cameron's Marlo Hotel
1895 The "Ridge Park" wrecked on Beware Reef
1900 Unofficial school taught by Miss Mulfahey
1902 Marlo State School 3433 opened
1906 Gluth's Marlo Hotel
1906 Marlo's first bridge completed
1907 Sir Reginald Talbot visits Marlo
1907 Marlo Cemetery Gazetted
1908 Stewart's Marlo Hotel
1908 Experimental farm developed on Marlo Plains
1910 Post Office at Stirling residence in Willis Ave
1914 Marlo Race Course Gazetted as temporary recreation reserve
1915 Shipping ceases in Port of Marlo
1916 Marlo Estate land sales along Willis Ave and Old Marlo Rd
1921 Gas light beacon flashing every 11 secs replaces kerosene
1925 Walter Rice builds a general store
1925 Post Office at Marlo Hotel
1926 First tour bus arrives in Marlo
1927 Seagull flying boat lands in estuary
1930 Walter Rice builds the "Ozone Picture Theatre"
1933 Marlo State School goes into recess
1936 Marlo State School reopened
1937 Land extension sales from Jorgenson St
1940 Marlo State School goes into recess
1942 Post office leaves Marlo Hotel
1946 Marlo State School reopened
1946-1947 Marlo Rural Fire Brigade formed
1946 Cape Conran Houses erected
1950 Snowy River Boat Club formed (power boats)
1950 Marlo Aerodrome land reserved
1950 Hall built at Cape Conran
1952 Marlo State School located in Jorgenson St
1954 Marlo Race Course Gazetted
1956-1960 Land extension sales north from Jorgenson St
1958-1961 Marlo Bridge built by J.C. Hourigan of Traralgon
1958 Marlo Tennis Club formed
1963 Electric light beacon flashing every 6 secs replaces gas
1965 Marlo Tennis Courts laid down in Jorgenson St
1965 Marlo Aerodrome opened
1967 Marlo Tennis Club Rooms built
1969 Post Office operates from Marlo General Store
1969 Electric power connected to Cape Conran
1970 Electric beacon moved to lighthouse reserve
1970 Mains water supplied from Rocky River
1971 First night flight into Marlo aerodrome
1972 Snowy River Boat Club goes into recess (power boats)
1972 Brick CFA building erected
1973 Moderate wildfire burned from Marlo to Cape Conran
1974 Automatic telephone exchange installed
1974 Marlo Boat Rescue Club formed
1977 Snowy River Boat Club emerges from recess
1981 Marlo's first take away food store
1981-1982 West Cape Boat ramp constructed
1982 CFA building extended
1982 Marlo Boat Rescue Club Shed on Jorgenson St built by Orbost Secondary College students

Street Name Derivations:  
Most street names were derived from the families that lived there or notable Marlo identities of the time.
Argyle Pde - Named for Sir Stanley Argyle who often fished Marlo in his boat, "Mascot"
Brodribb Dr - After the Brodribb River, which itself was named after an early settler.  A Patterson subdivision.
Conlon Rd - Named for the Conlon family, landholders at Marlo Plains adjacent to Point Ricardo
Conran Crt - Named after Cape Conran.  Originally a Fatchen subdivision.
Duncan St - Named for Duncan Cameron, early settler and licensee of the Marlo Hotel
Foreshore Rd - runs adjacent to the estuary foreshore
Harding Crt -
Healeys Rd - Possibly named for the Healey family who farmed the area
Holy Nelly Ln - So named for a prominent local resident and hotel licensee who often proclaimed 'Holy Nelly' and lived in the lane
Jorgenson St - Named for Martin Jorgenson, early settler after being wrecked at Pearl Point.  He also kept the "Ricardo Guest House" that operated opposite the Marlo Hotel and is still in the family.
Mills St - After a captain of one of the early trading vessels
Mots Beach Av - Named after Mots Beach.  Local belief is that it may stem from the acronym Mouth Of The Snowy.  Originally a Fatchen subdivision.
Perry St - After Henry Perry, longtime resident and descendant of early Orbost settler
Ricardo Dr - Named for Point Ricardo.  This drive was originally a Fatchen subdivision and the road this family lived on
Rodwell St - Named for the settler family that owned property adjacent to it
Saleni Dr -
Sampson's Lookout/St - After Mrs Sampson, a wealthy dentist and keen angler who fished around this area
Stewart St - Named for the licensees of the Marlo Hotel
Stirling St - Named for James Stirling and said to be the site of his home
Towner St - Named for the early settlers who lived near the corner of Argyle Pde and Foreshore Rd opposite the Marlo Hotel.  This house was said to be one of the first built in Marlo
Wakefield St - After Norman Wakefield, a Victorian naturalist and son of an Orbost saddler
 Ward St - After Roy Ward
William Crt - Originally an Eddlington subdivision
William Hunter Dr - Originally a Fatchen subdivision
Willis Ave - Said to be named after a city jeweller who called his home "Marlo".  Willis was the name of one of the persons associated with the syndicate that bought, subdivided and sold Stirling's property around the Old Marlo Rd in 1915.

References

Coastal towns in Victoria (Australia)
Towns in Victoria (Australia)
Shire of East Gippsland